The U.S. state of Colorado has twenty-one statistical areas that have been delineated by the Office of Management and Budget (OMB). Statistical areas are important geographic delineations of population clusters used by the OMB, the United States Census Bureau, planning organizations, and federal, state, and local government entities.

On March 6, 2020, the OMB delineated four combined statistical areas, seven metropolitan statistical areas, and ten micropolitan statistical areas in Colorado. The most populous of these statistical areas is the Denver–Aurora, CO Combined Statistical Area, with a population of 3,623,560 at the 2020 census.

Statistical areas
The Office of Management and Budget (OMB) has designated more than 1,000 statistical areas across the United States and Puerto Rico.

The OMB defines a core-based statistical area (commonly referred to as a CBSA) as "a statistical geographic entity consisting of the county or counties (or county-equivalents) associated with at least one core of at least 10,000 population, plus adjacent counties having a high degree of social and economic integration with the core as measured through commuting ties with the counties containing the core." The OMB further divides core-based statistical areas into metropolitan statistical areas (MSAs), which have a population of at least 50,000, and micropolitan statistical areas (μSAs), which have a population of at least 10,000, but fewer than 50,000.

The OMB defines a combined statistical area (CSA) as "a geographic entity consisting of two or more adjacent core-based statistical areas with employment interchange measures of at least 15%".

Counties by statistical areas

Primary statistical areas
Primary statistical areas (PSAs) include all combined statistical areas and any core-based statistical area that is not a constituent of a combined statistical area. Of the 21 statistical areas of Colorado, 12 are PSAs comprising four combined statistical areas, three metropolitan statistical areas, and five micropolitan statistical areas.

See also

Geography of Colorado
Demographics of Colorado
Front Range Urban Corridor
North Central Colorado Urban Area
South Central Colorado Urban Area
List of counties in Colorado
List of municipalities in Colorado
:Category:Colorado statistical areas

Notes

References

External links
Office of Management and Budget
United States Census Bureau
Colorado state government website

 
Statistical areas, list of
United States statistical areas
Colorado geography-related lists